Minister for Transport is a position in the government of Western Australia, currently held by Rita Saffioti of the Labor Party. The position was first created in 1945, in the ministry formed by Frank Wise, and has existed in almost every government since then. The minister is responsible for the Department for Transport.

Prior to 1974, there was a separate position called the Commissioner of Railways (1883–1902) or the Minister for Railways (1902–1974), with the holder of the position having responsibility solely for Western Australia's railways (including the Western Australian Government Railways).

From 1947 to 1959, there was also a Minister for Supply and Shipping, who had responsibility for imports into Western Australia.

List of transport ministers
Titles
 3 August 1945 – present: Minister for Transport

List of railways ministers
Titles
 10 July 1883 – 1 July 1902: Commissioner of Railways
 1 July 1902 – 8 April 1974: Minister for Railways

List of supply and shipping ministers
Titles
 5 January 1948 – 2 April 1959: Minister for Supply and Shipping

See also
 Minister for Road Safety (Western Australia)

References
 David Black (2014), The Western Australian Parliamentary Handbook (Twenty-Third Edition). Perth [W.A.]: Parliament of Western Australia.

Transport
Minister for Transport
Transport in Western Australia